Peggy Büchse (born 9 September 1972 in Rostock) is a former long-distance swimmer from Germany, who won her first international title at the 1987 European Junior Championships (400 m freestyle). In the early 1990s she switched to open water swimming, winning several international titles. Büchse retired in 2002.

References
  Short Profile

1972 births
Living people
German female freestyle swimmers
German female long-distance swimmers
German female swimmers
Sportspeople from Rostock
World Aquatics Championships medalists in open water swimming
20th-century German women
21st-century German women